Scott J. Newman (born January 14, 1947) is a Minnesota attorney and Republican member of the Minnesota Senate. He represents Senate District 18, which includes portions of McLeod, Meeker, Sibley and Wright counties just west of the Twin Cities metropolitan area. He is a former member of the Minnesota House of Representatives and was the Republican nominee for attorney general in the 2014 election.

Early life, education, and career
Newman graduated from Minnesota State University, Mankato in Mankato, receiving his B.A. in history and political science. He later earned his J.D. from William Mitchell College of Law in Saint Paul.

He previously worked as a deputy sheriff in Hennepin County, as a public defender, and as an administrative law judge.

Newman ran unsuccessfully as the Republican party endorsed candidate for the 1st Judicial District Court Judge in the 2006 election.

Minnesota House of Representatives
Newman served in the Minnesota House of Representatives from 2004 to 2007, running in a 2003 special election after Rep. Tony Kielkucki resigned to accept an appointment as a deputy secretary of state. While in the House, he served on the Education Finance, the Education Policy, the Governmental Operations and Veterans Affairs Policy, the State Government Finance, the Ethics, the Public Safety Policy and Finance, and the Transportation committees.

Minnesota Senate
Newman was first elected to the Senate in 2010, running after longtime incumbent Senator Steve Dille announced he would not seek re-election. Newman was re-elected in 2012, 2016 and 2020. He currently serves as chairman of the Senate Transportation Finance and Policy Committee.

References

External links

Senator Scott Newman official Minnesota Senate website
Project Vote Smart - Senator Scott Newman Profile

|-

Living people
1947 births
Republican Party members of the Minnesota House of Representatives
Republican Party Minnesota state senators
People from Hutchinson, Minnesota
Minnesota State University, Mankato alumni
William Mitchell College of Law alumni
Minnesota lawyers
Public defenders
21st-century American politicians